is an Apollo asteroid and a potentially hazardous object, that was discovered on March 23, 2013 by the Catalina Sky Survey. Further observation of its orbital calculation was made by amateur astronomer Mohammed Alsunni of Sudan.

 is a potentially hazardous asteroid (PHA) since its minimum orbit intersection distance (MOID) is less than 0.05 AU and its diameter is estimated to be greater than ~150 meters.

The Absolute magnitude of the asteroid is 21.70 giving the object an approximate diameter of 120–270 meters.

References

External links 
 
 
 

Minor planet object articles (unnumbered)

20130323